Tatiana Poliektova (born 1985) is a Russian animator, illustrator and film director, mostly working together with her twin sister Olga Poliektova.

Career
Tatiana Poliektova and her twin sister Olga were born in St. Petersburg, Russia.  After graduation from the St. Petersburg State University of Film and Television with major in animation and computer graphics, Tatiana and Olga started working together as film directors and animators duo. They also organized several workshops on animation in Russia, Germany, Italy, China and UAE.

During their early career they created several short animation films (Tomato story, Inspiration, Noise, I see you, Quagga, Warm Liguria, Cinema Dehors, Crab story, My Grandfather Was a Cherry Tree), presented at 150 festivals worldwide and received over 50 awards.

In 2013 Tatiana and Olga were invited to join the cantforget.it Digital Liguria Diary project (Italy), where together with eight other film directors they created a film about Liguria region (Warm Liguria).

In 2014 Tatiana and Olga were on the jury of the Lucania Film Festival (Pisticci, Italy).

In 2017 Tatiana was on the jury of the Ale Kino! International Young Audience Film Festival (Poznań, Poland).

Currently Tatiana and Olga work at Petersburg Animation Studio as directors for the kid’s animated series Babiriki (over a billion views on YouTube).

They also work on new animation film The swimmer in co-production with France and Germany.

Selected awards 

The 2015 animation film My Grandfather Was a Cherry Tree, created with the support of the Ministry of Culture of the Russian Federation, was selected for 170 festivals and won the Animated Short 2nd Place Award at the Giffoni Film Festival (2015)  and the Best Animated Short Jury Award at the New York International Children's Film Festival (2016) together 40 other awards. In 2017 it was included into the long list for Oscars nomination.

References

External links
 
 Personal Website

Russian film directors
Russian animators
Russian animated film directors
Russian women film directors
Russian illustrators
Russian women illustrators
Living people
1985 births